Whitefish Bay is an unincorporated community on the Lake Michigan shoreline in the town of Sevastopol, Door County, Wisconsin. Native Americans, likely the Menominee, called Whitefish Bay Ah-Quas-He-Ma-Ganing ("save our lives").

Glidden Drive stretches along the shore in Whitefish Bay. It is named after a banker from Michigan City, Indiana named Orrin Glidden, and is part of Rustic Road 9. Trails connecting to Glidden Drive stretch across public lands to provide access to Arbter and Schwartz lakes, and the Nature Conservancy operates a parking lot off of Glidden Drive.

In 1893, Joe Mardin purchased 43 acres nearby along Shivering Sands Creek. He built a four-story structure out of wood, especially wood he had found washed ashore. Called Castle Romance, the first story housed pigs, the second, geese, and the fourth, ducks. The third story was intended to lodge summer travelers and had several beds and a piano. In 1913, the first summer cottage along what is now Glidden Drive was built out of wood scrapped from Castle Romance.

Sherman Bay is a small bay about a half mile in size located south of Whitefish Bay and north of Lily Bay.

Roads

East Whitefish Bay Road (center) runs east towards Whitefish Bay, making a T intersections with three roads to the south: Lake of the Woods Road (left), Glidden Drive (center), and Moeller Drive (center left). The east end of the road is at Sevastopol Town Park with a beach and dock. Just before reaching the park, East Whitefish Bay Road intersects with Bark Road to the South and South Cave Point Drive to the north. South Cave Point Drive crosses Whitefish Bay Creek just upstream of its mouth (upper right) into Whitefish Bay. Bark Road continues south, ending at a T intersection with Glidden Drive. Glidden Drive extends to the lower border of the photograph at the row of Glidden Lodge Beach Resort condos (right lower border).

Northeastern part

Southern part

Glidden Drive runs parallel to the shore south of the row of Glidden Lodge Beach Resort condos (upper left corner). Extensive wooded areas both along the drive and set back further to the west are owned by the Nature Conservancy and the Wisconsin Department Natural Resources and are open to the public.

Climate

Gallery

References

Unincorporated communities in Wisconsin
Unincorporated communities in Door County, Wisconsin